Karla Álvarez (15 October 1972 – 15 November 2013) was a Mexican actress best known for her roles including Maria Mercedes and Alma Rebelde and as a contestant for Big Brother VIP in 2003. Her last TV appearance was Qué Bonito Amor  just before her death.

Personal life
In 1994 she was married to actor Alexis Ayala  and in 1995 they announced their separation. She remarried to Antonino D'Agostino.

Death
Álvarez was found dead on 15 November 2013 at her apartment due to respiratory failure due to pneumonia. Álvarez was rumored to have suffered from alcoholism and allegedly had an eating disorder. She also had an illness. It was the aforementioned illness that caused the death.

Filmography

Awards and nominations

References

External links
 

1972 births
2013 deaths
Deaths from respiratory failure
Mexican telenovela actresses
Mexican television actresses
Mexican film actresses
Mexican stage actresses
20th-century Mexican actresses
21st-century Mexican actresses
Actresses from Mexico City